Tomás O'Neill y Salmón (5 October 1764 – unknown) was a Spanish colonial governor of the western Caribbean archipelago of San Andrés, Providencia and Santa Catalina, today part of modern Colombia.

O'Neill was the son of an Irish father and Canarian mother  His family background made him bilingual and this ability would influence and aid his later career. He would be the interpreter on board the Spanish expedition sent to expel the English speaking population of the archipelago in 1789. He himself having arrived in the New World nine years prior to this   at the young age of 16. Rather than their expulsion (agreed to by the colonial powers under the Treat of Versailles and the Convention of 1786) he would be instrumental in not only helping secure the position of the existing inhabitants (English speaking Protestants), but would become their Governor and have a significant impact on the islands at a pivotal time in their history.

Early life and career
Tomás Francisco O'Neill y Salmón was born in Puerto de la Orotava, today Puerto de la Cruz, Tenerife, on October 5, 1764 to Patricio O'Neill (28 April 1740 - 18 April 1768) and Catalina Salmón. Puerto de la Cruz was part of the municipality of La Orotava at this time. His father, Patricio or Patrick was a native of Waterford Ireland, and was a vice consul for the British. He had arrived in Tenerife three years prior to his marriage to Catalina, which took place in January 1764. Patrick had close connections with the network of Irish merchants operating from Tenerife, including the wealthy Cologan family. His Mother, Catalina was born in Tenerife, though it´s possible both her parents, Thomas Salmón and Catalina (Catherine) Comerford were Irish. It is likely Tomás O'Neill was named after his maternal grandfather Thomas Salmón, though this was not the only thing they had in common, as Thomas Salmón was known to have acted as an interpreter in Tenerife. Sadly both O´Neill´s parents died when he and his brother Enrique were young and both were raised by their Aunt, María Salmón.

O'Neill was raised on the Canarian Island of Tenerife, by his Aunt on his Mother's side of the family, María Salmón. Leaving his native Tenerife he first tried his luck in the English speaking new world, spending two and a half years in Charleston South Carolina. However it would be in the Spanish speaking New World where he would pursue his career.

Together with his brother Enrique, he served in the Spanish military in the last two decades of the 1700s, and in the early years of the 1800s. Tomás O'Neill served in the Regimiento de Infanteria Fijo de Cartagena in Cartagena de Indias, together with Enrique. In 1791 Tomás was a lieutenant in the sixth company of the first battalion.

Tomás O'Neill arrives on San Andrés 
In December 1789, O'Neill, at the age of 25, was part of a Spanish mission under captain Juan de Gastelú to the islands of San Andrés and Providence in the western Caribbean. He was a lieutenant and interpreter. Coming from Irish heritage he did speak English, although Ireland itself in the 1700s remained a bilingual country. The aim of the mission was to enforce the terms of the Treaty of Versailles by evacuating all non-Spanish settlers from Spanish territories. This included the San Andrés Archipelago, Corn Islands and the Miskito coast. O'Neill's bilingual skills were necessary as San Andrés, at that time, was populated with English speaking landowners, their families and slaves. Some of the settlers left San Andrés prior to the Spanish missions arrival however others remained. "On December 21, 1789, the mission arrived in San Andrés. At dawn, Gastelú summoned the inhabitants and ordered them to evacuate, giving them until April 1790, four months to collect and transport their belongings".

It seems that O'Neill did more than interpret and in fact assisted in the mediation process between the Spanish Crown forces and the Islanders". O´Neill assisted in formulating the petition to the Spanish authorities for the Islanders to remain on the islands with the promise that they would be loyal subjects. "Compunct the inhabitants sent to Cartagena as their representative, the Irishman Lorenzo Thine with their pleas to the Crown". This petition was funneled through the Viceroy Antonio Caballero y Góngora.

Governorship 
In 1792 Madrid acquiesced to the Islanders remaining and in 1795  O´Neill was appointed as governor of the islands and promoted to the rank of captain. The islands would fall under the jurisdiction of the Captain-General of Guatemala. This remained the situation until 1803, when per a request from O'Neill (with the support of the islanders), the islands (together with the Miskito Coast) were transferred to the Viceroyalty of Nueva Granada, and thus they came under the administration of Cartagena. This change was, of course, significant, as in essence, this is why, they are today part of Colombia. The Miskito Coast was transferred back to Guatemala in 1806. The American geographer James J. Parsons characterized O'Neill's rule as one of a "benevolent dictator" and that in O'Neill, the Islanders had a champion before the Spanish Court. His detractors have accused him of being an opportunist and of essentially being an eighteenth-century lobbyist, having a habit of writing letters requesting appointments for himself and promotion. O'Neill's connections with the Spanish Court were through his network in Cartagena and the Canaries. He followed a pragmatic policy regarding the hispanisation of the existing population and an even more lax attitude to trading restrictions imposed against trading with non-Spanish ports in the western Caribbean. The islands were supposed to only trade with Cartagena and Trujillo in Honduras.

He was not dogmatic in imposing Catholicism taking a soft approach to the issue, preferring islanders as "buenos herejes no como malos católicos". However it does seem he himself was a devout Catholic. In 1797 O´Neill, asked the Spanish Crown to send two Catholic priests for the attention of the faithful in San Andres. He justified his request by lamenting in a letter that even his own wife and nine others had died without the last spiritual help, nor the reception of the holy oils. A Catholic priest was appointed and sent from the mainland in 1803 on a salary of 30 pesos a month and a church was constructed with funds from the Royal Treasury and Royal Coffers in Cartagena.

His pragmatic approach also extended to economic activities. O'Neill may not only have overlooked trading in contraband, but in fact have participated in such activities. Especially in interactions with his business partner on the mainland, his father-in-law, Agustin de Alfaro in León de Nicaragua. It has been argued that O´Neill lobbied for the removal of the islands from the jurisdiction of Guatemala, to that of Nueva Granada (Catagena) in order to keep authorities above him at a distance. Leaving these accusations aside, he did provide a stable government on the islands and regularized land ownership on the islands, granting titles to land parcels to the islanders. The economy thrived and the population grew under his tenure. He appointed alcaldes (mayors) and brought to San Andrés its first school teacher. His jurisdiction was, of course, an archipelago yet O'Neill tended to focus his attention on the island of San Andrés and left the islands of Providencia and Santa Catalina in the hands of Francis Archbold. The latter, a settler of Scottish heritage had come from Jamaica and had been instrumental in the resettlement of the two more northern islands.  Between 1798 and 1800, O´Neill was recalled to the continent (he married there in 1800) for reasons relating to the outbreak of new hostilities between Spain and Great Britain. The authorities believed the islands would be difficult to defend and O'Neill's abilities would be better utilized in Guatemala.  During his absence in 1799, San Andrés experienced a slave uprising. He returned to San Andrés in 1801. In his absence, Torquiel Bowie, an islander, stood in as his replacement. On his return he was welcomed back as he was viewed by the islanders as a "kind, enterprising and progressive man" he however seemingly found the island in disarray. Overall his policy with the continent was one of engagement. He established good relations with the King of the Miskito Coast. Indeed one of his last acts as governor was to sign a treaty with the Coast and its King, Stephen (Regent, 1800–1816).

British invasion 
On 26 March 1806 Captain John Bligh arrived on the H.M.S. Surreyance with 144 sailors and soldiers. With only around 30 soldiers in the island's garrison, O´Neill was persuaded to surrender. Bligh thus took control of the islands. He transported O'Neill to the continent and dropped him, his brother Enrique, a priest, and his men on a beach near Cartagena. As he had surrendered to Bligh, he was court-marshalled by the authorities, but was subsequently acquitted. O'Neill returned to the Islands on the 17th of October 1807. Bligh having left the islands poorly defended, O'Neill and his military force took back the islands for Spain.

Resignation 
O'Neill continued as Governor until he resigned in 1810 citing ill health. There are a number of theories on O'Neill's resignation. Some argue that having returned to Cartagena (against his will) O'Neill had become aware of the winds blowing in the direction of revolution against Spanish rule. The invasion had damaged his administration's infrastructure and there were limited financial resources to restore this. Despite promotion for himself and a government salary, funding of O'Neill's administration seemed to have been problematic. In that the higher authorities had instituted special tax concessions and tax exemptions on commercial activities which adversely impacted the financing of his administration.

Personal life and family 

Tomás O'Neill and his brother Enrique served the Spanish Crown in Cartagena de Indias and "became part of the elite of the city through two fortunate marriages". Unfortunately, Tomás's fortunate marriage was to end when his wife died on San Andrés, as he lamented in a letter in 1797 that there was no priest on the island to give her the last rights.  He did marry again, to María Manuela Alfaro de Monterroso in 1800 the daughter of Agustín de Alfaro his business agent in León (modern day Nicaragua). María was fourteen while Tomás was thirty five. They did have a daughter, Ann Eliza (1817-1862) who would grow up and marry Philip Beekman Jr. A man who also would have a significant impact on the history of the Archipelago.

Little is known about Enrique O'Neill (2 February 1766 – unknown). He came to the Americas under Tomas's patronage and acted as captain of the guard (this was made up of around 30 soldiers) in San Andrés. It's highly likely he was named after his paternal grandfather, a Henry O'Neill (10 September 1721 - unknown) back in Waterford. Enrique it seems also married well in Cartagena he married María Melchora de la Torre y Baloco in 1803. The O'Neill brothers did have a sister, Juana Maria, born on 15 April 1767. However other than a baptismal record no other records of her have come to light.

Little is also known regarding Tomás O'Neill's activities after he stood down as governor. He did have a daughter, born in 1817, seven years after he stood down. We also know that in 1822 Tomás O'Neill was on the island council, and that one of the signatures of a document proclaiming the Archipelago´s loyalty to Colombia, was in that same year, signed by him.

References

Spanish colonial governors and administrators
History of Colombia
Spanish people of Irish descent
1764 births
People from Puerto de la Cruz
Interpreters
18th-century Spanish military personnel